

Films

References

Films
1981
1981-related lists